Edwin Almonte (born December 17, 1976) is a former pitcher, who last played for the independent Schaumburg Flyers in 2009. He is 6'3", weighs 220 lbs, and bats and throws right-handed. He attended Seward Park High School in New York and Saint Francis College in Brooklyn.

Baseball career
Almonte was drafted in the 26th round of the  draft by the Chicago White Sox. In 12 games with the Mets in 2003, Almonte had an 11.12 ERA, 5 walks, and 7 strikeouts.

In December 2003, Almonte signed with the Boston Red Sox, and spent the year with the Triple-A Pawtucket Red Sox. While he was there, he had a record of 5–6, with a 5.50 ERA. He walked 22 and struck out 37. He left the Red Sox and became a free agent in March . He signed a minor league contract with the Detroit Tigers on February 16, 2005, and became a free agent at the end of the season.

Almonte had a career resurgence in 2007, making 44 appearances for the Newark Bears of the independent Atlantic League.  He would make 42 appearances for the Bears in 2008, and made 19 starts for the Schaumburg Flyers of the Northern League in 2009, going 6–10.

References

External links

1976 births
Living people
Arizona League White Sox players
Birmingham Barons players
Bristol White Sox players
Burlington Bees players
Charlotte Knights players
Dominican Republic emigrants to the United States
Erie SeaWolves players
Pawtucket Red Sox players
People from Santiago de los Caballeros
Major League Baseball pitchers
Major League Baseball players from the Dominican Republic
New York Mets players
Newark Bears players
Norfolk Tides players
Schaumburg Flyers players
St. Francis Fighting Saints baseball players
Winston-Salem Warthogs players
Seward Park High School alumni